The Hedwig Fountain or Lindenhof Fountain is a fountain in the Lindenhof hill in Zürich, Switzerland, which was built in 1912. The helmeted statue of a woman beside the fountain was made by Gustav Siber. It was built to honor the Zürich women, allegedly led by Hedwig ab Burghalden, who defended the city by duping the army of Duke Albert I of Germany during the siege of Zürich in 1292. They dressed in full battle gear in order to trick the Habsburg army into thinking that the city was well protected  while their men were busy campaigning at Winterthur.

The source of its water comes from the Limmat river.

Gallery

References

External links
 

Infrastructure completed in 1912
Fountains in Switzerland
Sculptures in Switzerland
Monuments and memorials in Switzerland
Buildings and structures in Zürich
Tourist attractions in Zürich
20th-century architecture in Switzerland